Delta-like 4 is a protein that in humans is encoded by the DLL4 gene.

This gene is a homolog of the Drosophila delta gene. The delta gene family encodes Notch ligands that are characterized by a DSL domain, EGF repeats, and a transmembrane domain.

References

Further reading

External links